Samuel Valencia (born 19 October 1947) is an Ecuadorian boxer. He competed in the men's light welterweight event at the 1968 Summer Olympics.

References

1947 births
Living people
Ecuadorian male boxers
Olympic boxers of Ecuador
Boxers at the 1968 Summer Olympics
Place of birth missing (living people)
Light-welterweight boxers